The Hunchback (aka The Hunchback of Notre Dame) is a 1997  made-for-television romantic drama film based on Victor Hugo's iconic 1831 novel The Hunchback of Notre-Dame, directed by Peter Medak and produced by Stephane Reichel. It stars Richard Harris as Claude Frollo, Salma Hayek as Esmeralda and Mandy Patinkin as Quasimodo, the titular hunchback of Notre Dame.

Plot

Summary
In 1480 Paris, Dom Claude Frollo finds an abandoned, deformed baby boy on the steps of Notre Dame and takes pity on him, believing him to be sent by God. He names the baby "Quasimodo", and raises him as his son.

Twenty-five years later in 1505, on the day of the Feast of Fools, Quasimodo is named the King of Fools by Clopin, the King of the Roma. A young Romani woman named Esmeralda honors Quasimodo with a dance. Both Frollo and Gringoire, a wandering poet, see her dancing, and both are entranced by her. Frollo stops the dance and scolds Quasimodo for leaving Notre Dame, telling him that if he ever goes outside the cathedral again, Frollo will not help him.

Frollo, after whipping himself for his lustful thoughts towards Esmeralda, pays two guards to kidnap her. They attempt to take her by force, but their plan is thwarted by Gringoire and Quasimodo, who protect her as Quasimodo is apprehended. Gringoire ultimately is nearly hanged by the Roma for trespassing on the Court of Miracles, but Esmeralda says she will marry him in return for rescuing her.

Angered by Quasimodo's disobedience, Frollo allows Quasimodo to be whipped in public for attacking Esmeralda, even though he is innocent. Esmeralda begs King Louis XI to stop the torture, but the King regards her as not a "real woman" and refuses to listen to her. Quasimodo is left for public humiliation for one hour, during which the crowd throws fruit at him. Quasimodo begs the crowd for water. Instead of helping him, they mock him further by shouting "Water" back at him. Frollo ignores Quasimodo's pleas for help. Esmeralda later gives Quasimodo some water. As a result, he becomes deeply infatuated with her. When he comes back to Notre Dame, he falls to the floor and cries while Frollo consoles him.

Esmeralda and Gringoire's sham marriage eventually grows into real love. A jealous Frollo disguises himself and reveals to Esmeralda the depths of his feelings to her. Esmeralda reads his palm and sees death. Terrified, she runs away, dropping her knife. Frollo takes the knife and stabs Minister Gauchére with it, believing the man to be a sinner for reading books other than the Bible.

Esmeralda is tried for the murder and found guilty after the metal boot torture. Frollo tells her that he will spare her if she gives herself to him, but she refuses. Quasimodo saves her from being hanged and publicly declares sanctuary. Captain Phoebus and his guards storm the cathedral, but Quasimodo defends it by throwing things at them.

Esmeralda stays in Notre Dame and she and Quasimodo become close friends. He introduces her to the bells of Notre Dame and tells her of his plans to write a 600-page book. Esmeralda confesses that she misses her goat Djali, so Quasimodo goes to the Court of Miracles to retrieve the goat. He gives his book to Gringoire to distribute to the citizens of Paris.

When he returns, Esmeralda is gone. He confronts Frollo who admits that he turned Esmeralda over to the authorities. Frollo, refusing to help clear Esmeralda's name at Quasimodo's insistence, severely whips him. Frollo reveals the truth of Quasimodo's origins and curses him as a freak. He attempts to whip him again, but the hunchback finally stands up for himself.

Esmeralda is about to be hanged once more, but the Gypsies rebel against the higher classes and demand that she be set free. Hanging Frollo over the edge of a balcony on Notre Dame, Quasimodo forces him to confess his crime to the crowd below. Believing he will gained absolution for his sins, Frollo shouts "It was I" leaving King Louis XI surprised. Esmeralda is freed and goes to Notre Dame to thank Quasimodo. However, Frollo, tempted again, attempts to stab her. Quasimodo intervenes and is stabbed instead. The pair fight, leading to Frollo falling to his death, while Quasimodo narrowly survives by hanging onto the parapet.

Quasimodo tells Esmeralda that the pain is too much. While she attempts to tend his stab wound, he reveals that the biggest wound lies in his heart. Gringoire and Esmeralda ring the bells of Notre Dame in tribute to Quasimodo as he peacefully dies.

Cast

 Mandy Patinkin as Quasimodo
 Richard Harris as Dom Claude Frollo
 Salma Hayek as Esmeralda
 Edward Atterton as Gringoire
 Benedick Blythe as Phoebus
 Nigel Terry as King Louis XI
 Jim Dale as Clopin
 Trevor Baxter as Chief Lawyer
 Vernon Dobtcheff as Father Michel
 Nickolas Grace as Minister Gauchére
 Matthew Sim as Crippled Man
 Cassie Stuart as Colette
 Gabriella Fon as Queen Anne

Production
The filming locations were Budapest, Prague, and Rouen. This film was released a year after Disney's animated version. Mandy Patinkin had been cast as Quasimodo in Disney's version, but left the role when he clashed with producers over the portrayal.
"I wanted to play Quasimodo for real," says Patinkin, who won a Tony for "Evita" and an Emmy for CBS' "Chicago Hope." But the producers wanted something different. "They had their own Disney needs," he explains. "I just right there at the audition said, 'I can't do this.' "

Reception

References

External links

 The Hunchback at the Internet Movie Database
 The Hunchback at Warner Archive
 The New York Times review

1997 films
1997 television films
New Zealand drama films
Films shot in Hungary
Films based on The Hunchback of Notre-Dame
Films directed by Peter Medak
Films scored by Edward Shearmur
Plan B Entertainment films
Films set in Paris
Films set in religious buildings and structures
Films with screenplays by John Fasano
Films about Romani people